Top 20 GAA Moments is a poll of the best moments of Gaelic football and hurling in the television era.

Background
In early 2005, the Irish public chose its favourite from 20 memorable moments from the last 40 years, as selected by ten RTÉ sports personalities and featured on the Sunday Sport programme. The number one moment was revealed in a special broadcast on Saturday 7 May 2005, the eve of the beginning of the All-Ireland hurling and football championships.

The special programme included the views of the ten judges, Des Cahill, Jim Carney, Ger Canning, Brian Carthy, Michael Lyster, Jimmy Magee, Marty Morrissey, Tony O'Donoghue, Micheál Ó Muircheartaigh and Darragh Maloney. There were also discussions with former players as to their views regarding the best moments.

As the programme was made in 2005 it does not feature more recent GAA highlights, such as Kevin Cassidy's long-range winner against Kildare in stoppage time at the end of extra-time in the 2011 All-Ireland quarter-final, or Michael Murphy's thunderbolt of a piledriver into the back of the net in the third minute of the 2012 All-Ireland Senior Football Championship Final.

List of "moments"

References

External links
 Top 20 GAA Moments (in a different order, from the Wayback Machine)
 
 
 

2005 in Gaelic games
2005 in Irish television
Gaelic games television series
RTÉ original programming